Vincennes Lincoln High School, usually referred to as Lincoln High School within Vincennes and archaically as Vincennes High School, is a high school located in Vincennes, Indiana. The school's primary colors are green and white with its secondary being orange, and its team name is The Alices (or The Lady Alices).

History
The original Vincennes High School, built in 1897, was located at Fifth and Buntin Streets, near downtown Vincennes. An addition was built in 1916 on the corner of Sixth and Buntin, with another 20-room addition replacing the 1897 section in 1958. Over the years, the name Lincoln High School became the school's official name.

In the fall of 1988, the high school was relocated to a newly built, more spacious building on Hart Street Road, on the southeast edge of town. With the addition of grade 6, Clark Middle School occupied the old high school building from 1988/89 until 2009/10. At that time, the middle school relocated to a new building adjacent to the high school, leaving the building vacant.

Athletics

The IHSAA uses the name "Vincennes Lincoln" to distinguish the school from Cambridge City Lincoln High School.  The Alices were State Champions in Basketball (1923) & (1981) and Baseball (2002). The mascot is called Big A.

Notable alumni
Albert K. Dawson, class of 1905, photographer and film correspondent in World War I 
David Goodnow, class of 1957, former CNN Anchor
Clint Barmes, class of 1997, Major League Baseball player - Colorado Rockies 2003–2010, Houston Astros 2011, Pittsburgh Pirates  2012–2014, San Diego Padres 2015
David Carter, class of 1972, football offensive lineman - Western Kentucky 1973-1976, Houston Oilers 1977–1984, New Orleans Saints 1984–1985
Curtis Painter, class of 2004, football quarterback - Purdue Boilermakers 2005-2008; Indianapolis Colts 2009–2011; Baltimore Ravens (practice squad) 2012; New York Giants 2013-2014
Dan Stryzinski, class of 1983, football punter - Indiana Hoosiers 1984-1987, Pittsburgh Steelers 1990–1991, Tampa Bay Buccaneers 1992–1994, Atlanta Falcons 1995–2000, Kansas City Chiefs 2001–2002, New York Jets 2003

See also
 List of high schools in Indiana

References

External links
School website
School district website

High schools in Southwestern Indiana
Vincennes, Indiana
Big Eight Conference (IHSAA)
Former Southern Indiana Athletic Conference members
Schools in Knox County, Indiana
School buildings completed in 1988
Public high schools in Indiana
1897 establishments in Indiana